Kargazlu (also Romanized as Kargazlū and Kargezlū; also known as Gergazu and Karkazlū) is a village in Khvoresh Rostam-e Shomali Rural District, Khvoresh Rostam District, Khalkhal County, Ardabil Province, Iran. At the 2006 census, its population was 46, in 21 families.

References 

Tageo

Towns and villages in Khalkhal County